Osric Chau (born July 20, 1986)  is a Canadian actor, best known for his role as Kevin Tran in the CW series Supernatural, Vogel in the BBC America series Dirk Gently's Holistic Detective Agency, and Ryan Choi in the TV shows set in the Arrowverse.

Life and career
Chau was born in Vancouver, British Columbia to a father from Hong Kong and a mother from Malaysia. In 2000, he took up Wing Chun and continued to study the martial art for eight years. He also studied tai chi and traditional forms of wushu under Zhang Zhi Bing, a master from Harbin, China. After four years, upon Zhang's return to China, Chau enrolled in West Coast Chinese Martial Arts in Vancouver under head instructor Bruce Fontaine and studied modern wushu, a more performance-orientated martial art. In 2007, Chau trained for seven months with the BSU Wushu Team at Beijing Sport University in preparation for the Canadian National Team Trials. Upon his return, he became a member of the Canadian National Wushu Team.

Chau originally wanted to be a stuntman rather than an actor, and worked on stunts for EA Games before appearing in his first major role opposite David Carradine and Daryl Hannah in the two-part TV movie Kung Fu Killer. He went on to make his feature film debut in a supporting role in the 2009 film 2012 and later became more well known through his recurring role as Kevin Tran in the CW fantasy series Supernatural.

Chau has collaborated with the YouTube channel The Hillywood Show in video parodies of The Walking Dead, Supernatural, and Sherlock. He has also been involved with campaigns against stereotyping in media.

In 2018, Chau starred in the Manila-set independent film Empty by Design alongside Filipina actress Rhian Ramos and Crazy Rich Asians actor Chris Pang. Empty by Design marks Chau's first feature film producing endeavor. In September 2019, Chau was cast at Ryan Choi in the Arrowverse, and was featured during three of the "Crisis on Infinite Earths" episodes. In November 2019, he was cast as the lead to the Indonesian horror film, The Villa.

In 2021, he returned to The Flash as Ryan Choi for the third and fourth parts of its "Armageddon" event which opened the eighth season. This was an alternate timeline version who had no family, but as part of Team Flash had taken up the mantle of Atom like in the comics.

Filmography

Television

Film

Other

References

External links
 
 
 

Living people
Canadian male actors of Hong Kong descent
Canadian male film actors
Canadian male television actors
Canadian male voice actors
Canadian people of Malaysian descent
Canadian wushu practitioners
Male actors from Vancouver
21st-century Canadian male actors
Canadian male actors of Malaysian descent
1986 births